Sir John Mordaunt, 9th Baronet (24 August 1808 – 27 September 1845) was an English politician.

He was appointed High Sheriff of Warwickshire in 1833 and represented the constituency of South Warwickshire. from 1835 to 1845.

He was one of the Mordaunt Baronets and was succeeded by Sir Charles Mordaunt, 10th Baronet.

References

External links 
 

1808 births
1845 deaths
Mordaunt baronets
High Sheriffs of Warwickshire
Members of the Parliament of the United Kingdom for English constituencies
UK MPs 1835–1837
UK MPs 1837–1841
UK MPs 1841–1847
Sheriffs of Warwickshire